Grapevine virus F (GVF) is a plant virus species in the genus Vitivirus.

References

External links 
 ICTV Virus Taxonomy 2009
 UniProt Taxonomy

Betaflexiviridae
Viral grape diseases